In England, an unparished area is an area that is not covered by a civil parish (the lowest level of local government, not to be confused with an ecclesiastical parish). Most urbanised districts of England are either entirely or partly unparished. Many towns and some cities in otherwise rural districts are also unparished areas and therefore no longer have a town council or city council, and are instead directly managed by a higher local authority such as a district or county council.

Until the mid-nineteenth century there had been many areas that did not belong to any parish, known as extra-parochial areas. Acts of Parliament between 1858 and 1868 sought to abolish such areas, converting them into parishes or absorbing them into neighbouring parishes. After 1868 there were very few extra-parochial areas left; those remaining were mostly islands, such as Lundy, which did not have a neighbouring parish into which they could be absorbed.

Modern unparished areas (also termed "non-civil parish areas"), were created in 1965 in London and in 1974 elsewhere. They generally arose where former urban districts, municipal boroughs or county boroughs were abolished and where no successor parish was established. Parishes were not allowed in Greater London until the passing of the Local Government and Public Involvement in Health Act 2007 (which allows their formation in the London boroughs) and it remained entirely unparished from 1965 until Queen's Park was created in 2014.

Some cities and towns which are unparished areas in larger districts (i.e. not districts of themselves) have charter trustees to maintain a historic charter, such as city status (an example being in Bath) or simply the mayoralty of a town.

List of unparished areas
Local authorities which are entirely parished are not listed. The ceremonial counties of Cornwall (apart from Wolf Rock), Herefordshire, Isle of Wight, Northamptonshire, Northumberland, Rutland, Shropshire, and Wiltshire are entirely parished.

Unparished areas in 1974 and subsequent changes
This is a list of unparished areas as they existed on 1 April 1974, noting changes which have happened since then to create the current geography in the table above.

See also
 Extra-parochial area
 Unincorporated area in other countries

Notes

References

 
Civil parishes in England
Local government in England